An explosimeter is a gas detector which is used to measure the amount of combustible gases present in a sample.  When a percentage of the lower explosive limit (LEL) of an atmosphere is exceeded, an alarm signal on the instrument is activated.

The device, also called a combustible gas detector, operates on the principle of resistance proportional to heat—a wire is heated, and a sample of the gas is introduced to the hot wire. Combustible gases burn in the presence of the hot wire, thus increasing the resistance and disturbing a Wheatstone bridge, which gives the reading.

A flashback arrestor is installed in the device to avoid the explosimeter igniting the sample external to the device.

Note, that the detection readings of an explosimeter are only accurate if the gas being sampled has the same characteristics and response as the calibration gas.  Most explosimeters are calibrated to methane or hydrogen.

References

External links
 https://web.archive.org/web/20050910075254/http://www.marineengineering.org.uk/testequipment/explosimeter.htm (select explosimeter from the left frame)
 Explosimetry

Explosion protection
Gas technologies
Measuring instruments